Mustafa Eser (born 29 August 2001) is a Turkish footballer who plays as a centre-back for Ümraniyespor.

Professional career
On 6 September 2019, Eser signed his first professional contract with Ümraniyespor. He helped the team achieve promotion into the Süper Lig for the 2022–23 season. He made his professional debut with Ümraniyespor in a 3–1 Süper Lig loss to Fatih Karagümrük on 22 October 2022.

References

External links
 
 

2001 births
Living people
People from Ümraniye
Turkish footballers
Ümraniyespor footballers
Süper Lig players
TFF First League players
Association football defenders